Elysia diomedea is a species of sea slug, a marine gastropod mollusc in the family Plakobranchidae.

This sea slug resembles a nudibranch but is not closely related to that order of gastropods, instead belonging to a closely related clade, Sacoglossa, the "sap-sucking" sea slugs.

Description
It is a pale green colour with longitudinal streaks of white. The parapodia are densely convoluted and edged with orange and black. They are not joined at the front and when they are spread apart, they reveal blue spots underneath. Parts of the gut ramify into the foot, causing green patches which are interspersed with translucent white streaks. The rhinophores have longitudinal stripes of yellow and black.

Distribution
Elysia diomedea is found in the eastern Pacific Ocean off the coasts of Central America including the Gulf of Panama and the Gulf of California, where it is common.

Biology
Elysia diomedea exhibits kleptoplasty in the same way as do the closely related Elysia clarki and Elysia crispata. When it feeds on algae, some of the chloroplasts that it has ingested remain in its tissues. It then makes use of the energy they produce as they continue to photosynthesize. To maximise this, the slug is often seen in sunlit shallow waters, spreading its parapodia.

Elysia diomedea deposits its eggs in an "egg ribbon" which forms a flat spiral. The eggs are very tiny, which suggests that they pass through a veliger larval stage as part of the zooplankton before settling on the seabed, undergoing metamorphosis and becoming juvenile crawling slugs.

References

 Jensen K.R. (2007) Biogeography of the Sacoglossa (Mollusca, Opisthobranchia). Bonner Zoologische Beiträge 55:255–281.

External links
 

Plakobranchidae
Gastropods described in 1894